Mosaab Mohamoud Mohamed Elhassan (born on January 1, 1983, in Al-Fashir, North Darfur) is a naturalized Qatari footballer, who currently plays for Al Bidda .

Career
The defender was loaned out in January 2010 to Al Sadd from Al-Kharitiyath.

Mosaab was born and raised in Sudan, but became a naturalized Qatari citizen, and plays for the Qatar national football team.

References

External links 
Goalzz.com profile

1983 births
Living people
People from North Darfur
Qatari footballers
Qatar international footballers
Sudanese footballers
Sudanese emigrants to Qatar
Naturalised citizens of Qatar
Qatari people of Sudanese descent
Qatar Stars League players
Qatari Second Division players
Al Sadd SC players
Al Kharaitiyat SC players
El Jaish SC players
Umm Salal SC players
Al-Rayyan SC players
Al-Arabi SC (Qatar) players
Al-Gharafa SC players
Al-Khor SC players
Al-Markhiya SC players
Al Bidda SC players
Association football defenders